School Days is a 1921 American comedy film directed by William Nigh, written by Walter DeLeon, Hoey Lawlor and William Nigh, and starring Wesley Barry, George Lessey, Nellie Parker Spaulding, Margaret Seddon, Arline Blackburn, and J.H. Gilmour. It was released by Warner Bros. on December 25, 1921 and was Warner's biggest grossing film until The Sea Beast in 1926.

Prints of School Days survives at the George Eastman House and UCLA Film and Television Archive with one reel missing.

Plot
As described in a film magazine, Speck Brown (Barry) is a country boy who has been raised by the hard hearted Deacon Jones (Lessey). The Deacon insists that Speck attend school, but when the teacher (Seddon) defends the boy against his viscous guardian, Jones turns against her. Speck becomes acquainted with a Stranger (Gilmour) who comes to town and Speck realizes his ambition, through the Stranger, to go to New York City and have plenty of money. At a private school he continues his boyish pranks and is snubbed when he gives a party to his wealthy neighbors. A couple of crooks plan to make Speck the goat in a scheme involving his friend Leff (Conlon), the inventor of a patent clothespin. Disgusted with society and realizing that money cannot buy him happiness or friends, Speck returns to his boyhood home and finds happiness there.

Cast   
Wesley Barry as Speck Brown
George Lessey as his Guardian, Deacon Jones
Francis Conlon as His Friend, Leff
Nellie Parker Spaulding as His Friend's Wife 
Margaret Seddon as His Teacher
Arline Blackburn as His Sweetheart
J.H. Gilmour as The Stranger 
John Galsworthy as Mr. Hadley 
Jerome Patrick as Mr. Wallace, an Attorney 
Evelyn Sherman as His Sister
Arnold Lucy as The Valet

Box office
According to Warner Bros records the film earned $546,000 domestically and $32,000 foreign.

References

External links

1921 films
1920s English-language films
Silent American comedy films
1921 comedy films
Warner Bros. films
Films directed by William Nigh
American silent feature films
American black-and-white films
1920s American films